Renzo Rossi (born 23 January 1951 in Giacciano con Baruchella) is a retired Italian professional football player.

Career
Rossi began playing football with local side Passirio Merano. After spells with lower-level sides Astimacobi, Oltrisarco and Como, he joined Internazionale in 1974, where he would make his Serie A debut against Milan on 10 November 1974.

References

1951 births
Living people
Italian footballers
Serie A players
Como 1907 players
Inter Milan players
S.S. Lazio players
U.S. Catanzaro 1929 players
Taranto F.C. 1927 players
Association football forwards
Asti Calcio F.C. players